James Knox Polk Hall (September 30, 1844 – January 5, 1915) was a Democratic member of the U.S. House of Representatives from Pennsylvania.

Biography
James K. P. Hall was born in Milesburg, Pennsylvania.  He was educated in Pittsburgh, Pennsylvania.  He studied law and was admitted to the bar in 1866.  He was elected district attorney of Elk County, Pennsylvania in 1867, and reelected in 1870 and 1873.  He retired from the practice of law in 1883 to engage in the coal, lumber, and railroad businesses as well as banking.

Hall was elected as a Democrat to the Fifty-sixth and Fifty-seventh Congresses and served until his resignation.  He was a member of the Pennsylvania State Senate from 1902 to 1914.  He died in Tampa, Florida, in 1915.  Interment in Pine Grove Cemetery, Ridgway, Pennsylvania.

Sources

The Political Graveyard

1844 births
1915 deaths
Democratic Party Pennsylvania state senators
Pennsylvania lawyers
People from Elk County, Pennsylvania
People from Centre County, Pennsylvania
County district attorneys in Pennsylvania
Democratic Party members of the United States House of Representatives from Pennsylvania
19th-century American politicians
19th-century American lawyers